(born 29 April 1936 in Roppongi, Tokyo) is a film critic and an academic researcher on French literature from Japan. He was president of the University of Tokyo from 1997 to 2001.

Life and work 
Hasumi's father Shigeyasu was a professor at Kyoto University. His wife Chantal Van Melkebeke is a teacher from Belgium.

Hasumi was influential in introducing French post-structuralist theory to Japan, and was himself influenced by such French thinkers as Gilles Deleuze. He has written on the film directors Yasujirō Ozu, Sadao Yamanaka, John Ford, Howard Hawks, and Jean Renoir. He promoted such new directors as Takeshi Kitano. Several of his students, including Kiyoshi Kurosawa, Shinji Aoyama, Kunitoshi Manda, Masayuki Suo, and Makoto Shinozaki, have gone on to become filmmakers.

His personal name has been spelt variously as Shigehiko, the standard Hepburn romanization, Shiguehiko and Shiguéhiko on his publications. For example, his biography of Yasujirō Ozu features the name Shiguéhiko on both the original Japanese and the French translation, whereas many translations of his books feature the form Shigehiko.

Selected bibliography
 Hihyō Aruiwa Kashi no Saiten (1974)
 Han Nihongo Ron (1977)
 Natsume Sōseki Ron (1978)
 Eiga no Shinwagaku (1979)
 Eizō no Shigaku (1979)
 Hyōsō Hihyō Sengen (1979)
 Cinema no Kioku Sōchi (1979)
 Eiga: Yūwaku no Ekurichūru (1983)
 Kantoku Ozu Yasujirō (1983)
 Monogatari Hihan Josetsu (1985)
 Kanbotsu Chitai (1986)
 Bonyō na Geijutsuka no Shōzō (1988)
 Shōsetsu Kara Tōku Hanarete (1989)
 Teikoku no Inbō (1991)
 Hollywood Eigashi Kōgi (1993)
 Zettai Bungei Jihyō Sengen (1994)
 Tamashii no Yuibutsuronteki na Yōgo no Tame ni (1994)
 Opera Opérationnelle (1994)
 Watakushi ga Daigaku ni Tsuite Shitteiru Ni San no Kotogara (2001)
 Supōtsu Hihyō Sengen (2004)
 Eiga e no Fujitsunaru Sasoi (2004)
 Miserarete: Sakka Ronshū (2005)
 Godāru Kakumei (2005)
 Hyōshō no Naraku (2006)
 Aka no Yūwaku (2007)
 Eiga Hōkai Zenya (2008)
 Eigaron Kōgi (2008)
 Godāru Mane Fūkō (2008)
 Zuisō (2010)
 Eiga Jihyō 2009-2011 (2012)

References

External links
Mube.jp, a website for which he serves as coordinator, containing some of his essays

1936 births
Living people
Film theorists
Japanese film critics
University of Tokyo alumni
Academic staff of Rikkyo University
Academic staff of the University of Tokyo
Historians of French literature
Commandeurs of the Ordre des Arts et des Lettres
Presidents of the University of Tokyo
Presidents of The Japan Association of National Universities